The Southbury Loop (formerly known as the Churchbury loop) is a line linking Edmonton Green, in north-east London, to Cheshunt. It was opened by the Great Eastern Railway in 1891 although initially it was not very successful and was closed to passenger traffic in 1909. Goods trains continued to use the line although in World War I passenger services were reinstated for munitions workers. Once the war finished the line returned to its goods-only role although was occasionally used for diversionary purposes when the West Anglia Main Line was closed south of Cheshunt. Electrification of the line and the reintroduction of passenger services in 1960 saw the line become busy with regular suburban services as part of the Lea Valley Lines network. Since May 2015 passenger services on the line are part of London Overground.

History

Opening and early years (1891-1923)

The line from Bury Street Junction, north of Lower Edmonton High Level railway station, to Cheshunt was opened by the Great Eastern Railway on 1 October 1891 and known as the Churchbury Loop. It had first been considered by the GER in the 1860s as part of programme of suburban expansion. The opening of the Enfield Town branch had helped Enfield and Tottenham to grow so in its "Additional Powers Act" the GER applied for a branch to leave the Bethnal Green to Edmonton line (now the line via Seven Sisters).and join the main line near Enfield Lock. The reasoning was that the new line would open up housing development in the area but it was another seven years before construction started in 1889. The contract worth £94,322 was let to contractor Walter Scott and Co of Newcastle-under-Tyne.

Although construction costs were relatively low, the GER provided well built stations in anticipation of the business these stations were expected to generate. The line was 5 miles and 75 chains long with stations at Churchbury, Forty Hall and Theobalds Grove. Goods yards were provided at Churchbury and Forty Hall stations and there was also a siding serving a brick works close to Churchbury.

The district remained predominantly rural, and with the coming of the tram to Waltham Cross, in 1908, the railway was unable to compete and passenger numbers fell by half. The line was not helped by the fact that few trains ran through to Liverpool Street with most terminating at White Hart Lane.

On 4 July 1899, permission was granted by the Board of Trade for a goods yard which was built and opened at Theobalds Grove by the end of that year.

Passenger services were withdrawn on 1 October 1909 and the then president of the Board of trade, Winston Churchill, had to answer a question on the subject in the House of Commons as a railway closure was, at that point, a rare occurrence.

During World War I the Lea Valley was a centre of the munitions industry and the government called on the GER to restore passenger services which served the original stations plus a purpose-built wooden halt called Carterhatch Lane Halt. The service started operating to the original stations on 1 March 1915 and to Carterhatch Lane Halt on 4 July 1916, but once the war finished demand again fell off and services were withdrawn on 1 July 1919.

London and North Eastern Railway (1923-1947)
Following the 1923 grouping the line was operated by the London & North Eastern Railway (LNER).

In the early 1920s house building took place in the area which had been opened up by the building of the A10 road. The LNER board were uninterested in reopening the line to passenger traffic, although it may have been problems with the capacity of the line in the Hackney Downs area that drove this decision.

During this period the down line (from London) was used by goods trains whilst the up line was used for wagon storage.
 
The line was used for diversionary purposes on a number of occasions, especially during the Second World War, when enemy action made the main line unusable or when the main line was flooded by the River Lea.

On 2 January 1945, Theobalds Grove station was damaged by a V2 rocket which exploded close by.

British Railways (1948-1994)
On nationalisation responsibility for operating the line fell to the Eastern Region of British Railways. Operations continued in much the same vein but with more new housing being built locally plans were put forward to electrify the line and re-open it for passenger services (although this was first mooted as early as 1944). The site of Carterhatch Lane Halt (see above) was used as the electrification depot (for both this line and the wider electrification of the area). The line was resignalled with colour light signaling replacing the older mechanical signalling which largely dated from the opening of the line. The signalling was commissioned on 3 July 1960 with passenger services commencing on 21 November 1960. With the renaming of Churchbury station to Southbury the line became known as the Southbury Loop. The former Forty Hill station was named Turkey Street as part of the re-launch.

The goods yard at Theobalds Grove closed in 1966 and Southbury in 1970.

When sectorisation was introduced in the 1980s, the station was served by Network SouthEast until the privatisation of British Railways.

The privatisation era (1994 - present day)
The Railways Act 1993 split the railway into two parts with Railtrack being responsible for the maintenance of the infrastructure and a series of different companies operating the services.

However, before the franchises were let operation was in the hands of independent business units.

The first of the private sector operators was the West Anglia Great Northern (WAGN) Railway which operated suburban services on the West Anglia Main Line and associated branches. It also operated the suburban services out of Kings Cross and Moorgate stations and its rolling stock was maintained at Hornsey and Ilford depots. It commenced operation in January 1997.

On 3 October 2002 Railtrack was bought by Network Rail who became responsible for the infrastructure on the branch.

WAGN operated the Southbury Loop from January 1997 until 2004 when the UK Strategic Rail Authority made changes to the franchise arrangements and the line became part of the Greater Anglia franchise which covered the whole of East Anglia. The new franchise was named the "one" franchise by successful bidder National Express.

The single franchise was renamed National Express East Anglia and continued operation of the branch until 2012. Operation then passed to the Abellio Greater Anglia franchise. However, on 31 May 2015 the suburban Liverpool Street-Cheshunt service transferred to London Overground; a few peak services run by Abellio Greater Anglia between Liverpool Street-Hertford East/Broxbourne still continue to use the line.

Passenger services
In the early years the loop had a good service although few trains outside the peak hour operated to Liverpool Street. Most trains terminated at White Hart Lane railway station necessitated a change and this factor probably helped to stifle passenger numbers.

During World War I a shuttle service operated between Lower Edmonton Low Level station and the loop. Passengers had to change to the virtually adjacent high level station (now named Edmonton Green) to continue their journey.

In the May 1964 timetable the loop services worked fast from Liverpool Street to Edmonton Green thence calling all stations to Broxbourne where the trains (formed of two electric Multiple Units) split with one half going to Hertford East and the other to Bishops Stortford (then the limit of electrification on the West Anglia Main Line).

With the opening of the Victoria line in 1968 services started calling at the interchange station at Seven Sisters.

Since then various permutations of the timetable have been tried, but the May 2015 service (Table 21) which is basically half-hourly calling all stations to Liverpool Street from the bay platform at Cheshunt. In the peak hours the Hertford East services also operate via the loop.

Goods services
The majority of goods services on the branch would have originated from Temple Mills yard (near Stratford) or Park Yard (adjacent to Northumberland Park railway station) and been routed via Lower Edmonton or South Tottenham. Inward traffic would have included coal and building materials. In the early years market produce was sent out along with bricks and as the area became more industrialised some factories sent out goods via this route. The First World War generated additional munitions traffic between 1915 and 1918.

By 1970 there were no goods facilities on the loop.

In the May 2014 freight working timetable (Book LD01) one service (6X36 1952 Hoo Junction to Whitemoor) is booked to use the branch between Seven Sisters and Bury Street Junction along with a small number of track machine and light engine moves.

Locomotives
Between the opening in 1891 and the 1909 closure trains would have been operated by small GER tank engines such as the GER Class R24 0-6-0T.

During World War I the auto-train service was worked by Great Eastern Railway Class Y65 (LNER Class F7) 2-4-2T.

Local goods services would have been typically worked by GER Class Y14 (LNER J15) and Class G58 (LNER Class J17) 0-6-0 locomotives in GER, LNER and the early British Railways years. Nearly all the locomotives would have been allocated to Stratford engine shed which covered duties in this area.

Carriages & multiple unit

During the re-opening in the First World War the line was operated by a two-car autotrain.

After electrification EMU classes that operated the line included:

 British Rail Class 302
 British Rail Class 305
 British Rail Class 306
 British Rail Class 307
 British Rail Class 308

By the 1980s these units were being withdrawn and replaced by more modern stock. Since then the branch has generally been worked by either British Rail Class 315 or British Rail Class 317 EMUs.

Notes

References

Great Eastern Railway
Railway lines in London
Rail transport in Hertfordshire
Transport in the London Borough of Enfield